Thomas Weiss may refer to:

 Thomas G. Weiss (born 1946), scholar of international relations
 Thomas J. Weiss (born 1942), professor of economics